Marathos may refer to:
 Amrit, an ancient Phoenician city
 Marathos Island, a Greek Island in the Aegean Sea
 Marathos, Crete, a village in the municipality of Malevizi, Crete, Greece
 Marathos, Evrytania, a village in the municipality of Agrafa, Evrytania, Greece
 Marathos, Karditsa, a village in the municipality of Argithea, Karditsa regional unit, Greece